The Piolet d'Or ("Golden Ice Axe") is an annual mountaineering and alpine climbing award organized by the  (GHM), and previously with co-founder Montagnes Magazine, since its founding in 1992.  Golden ice axes are presented to the annual winners at a weekend awards festival based on their achievements in the previous year. It is considered mountaineering's highest honor and is referred to as the "Oscars of mountaineering".

The Piolets have progressed from being a competition-like single-award event (Le Piolet d'Or) into a broader celebration of mountaineering and alpinism, with several awards made (Les Piolets d'Or).  After a crisis in 2008, the Charter for the awards was rewritten to focus on the style and innovation of the nominations, respect for the mountain, environment, and future climbing generations, and to increase the independence and transparency of the award process.

History

At the start of the 1990s, it was difficult to raise funds for major mountaineering expeditions in France. The French Federation of Mountaineering and Climbing could no longer fund expeditions (as it had done since the French Annapurna expeditions).

From the outset, there was some concern over the ethics of rewarding and promoting the dangerous undertaking of modern extreme alpine climbing. After a controversial 1998 Piolet was awarded to a Russian team of which two had died on the route, the rules were changed the following year so that nominees had to have completed their climbs safely.  The New York Times remarked on the proportion of Piolet d'Or winners who have subsequently died while mountaineering, but that the awards criteria had been further amended over time to emphasize "style" over pure "risk-taking". 

There was also a concern, particularly within the alpine climbing community, on the decision to select a single winner from a list of alpine ascents. The situation came to a head during the 2007 Piolet d'Or awards over accusations by then GHM president, Leslie Fuscko, that Chaumereuil had imposed the shortlist, which led to the resignation of Jury President Andrej Štremfelj.  Further controversy occurred when Marko Prezelj, a 2007 Piolet d'Or winner, wrote a public article criticizing the premise of the awards, and whether it was possible, or ethical, to have a single winner.

The 2007 controversy led to a fundamental re-think of the structure of the awards, a long process that required the 2008 awards to be canceled. A new Charter was drawn up and the 2009 Piolet d'Or, the 17th awards, followed a very different format; multiple winners were announced (initially under different headings, but the headings were later dropped), a new "Lifetime Achievement Award" was announced (some awards were accused as being such an award in disguise), and the first female winner was announced. Jury President Doug Scott heralded the post-2008 Charter, saying: "This edition signals the rebirth of the Piolets d'Or. For us there are no winners, no losers. The honored are the ambassadors of an art, a passion".

In 2013, the jury embraced the new Charter to the fullest by awarding Piolets to all six shortlisted nominees, an act that drew criticism from Montagnes.  Since 2015, the winners have been announced in advance of the ceremony to emphasize that the ceremony was "a not a competition, but a celebration". In 2016, two of the award's biggest critics, Voytek Kurtyka and Marko Prezelj accepted their awards at the 2016 Piolets d'Or ceremony at La Grave; where only GHM remained from the original founders. In 2018, for the first time in its history, none of the award ceremony was held in France, when the Piolet d'Or ceremony was held at the Ladek Film Festival in Poland. The 2019 awards were overshadowed by the recent deaths of two of the three winners, David Lama and Hansjörg Auer.

Multiple winners
The following climbers have won more than one Piolet d'Or since its inception in 1992:
4 times. Marko Prezelj (1992, 2007, 2015, 2016), Paul Ramsden (2003, 2013, 2016, 2017).
3 times. Mick Fowler (2003, 2013, 2016), Kazuya Hiraide (2009, 2018, 2020).
2 times. Valery Babanov (2002, 2004), Aleš Česen (2015, 2019), Dmitry Golovchenko (2013, 2017), Zdenek Hák (2018, 2020), Marek Holecek (2018, 2020), Kenro Nakajima (2018, 2020), Sergey Nilov (2013, 2017), Mark Richey (2012, 2020), Ueli Steck (2009, 2014), Luka Stražar (2012, 2019), Steve Swenson (2012, 2020).

Criteria

Post the 2008 crisis, a new Charter was drafted to clarify the basis and values on which the awards would be chosen:

In addition, the Charter laid out the specific criteria under which all future nominees would be assessed:
 Style of ascent.
 Spirit of exploration: original (previously unclimbed) route and/or mountain, creative and innovative approach.
 Level of commitment and self-sufficiency.
 High level of technical ability required.
 Suitability of route in light of objective dangers.
 Efficient and sparing use of resources.
 Transparency regarding the use of these resources.
 Respect for people, climbing partners, members of other teams, porters, and local agents.
 Respect for the environment.
 Respect for future generations of mountaineers by leaving them the possibility of enjoying the same kind of experiences and adventures.

The new Charter also underlined that awards, and the ceremony, should be a "celebration of mountaineering", and not a "climbing competition".  The term "winners", and even the term "award", was downplayed in favor of terms such as "nominees". In 2014, National Geographic said of the revised Piolet charter: "The Piolet d’Or is about sharing our experiences as alpinists with a wider audience, trying to learn about the human experience through adventure. The era of the heroic warrior climber who climbs themselves literally to death in the high mountains is over".

Reception
The Piolet d'Or is generally considered the highest honor in mountaineering and alpine climbing. In 2021, the New York Times described it as "Alpinism's biggest prize", and that even though it had some vocal critics, it had widespread support amongst the climbing community. On receiving a Piolet in 2015, Alex Honnold told National Geographic, "I've always joked that if I won a Piolet d’Or I'd retire from climbing", and "And I do think it’s appropriate to honor some climbs for pushing the sport in positive directions. Whether our ascent is deserving or not is open to debate, that’s fine. But people definitely climb inspiring things every year and I think it’s worth celebrating that in some way".  The Piolet d'Or awards are regularly referred to as the "Oscars of mountaineering".

Criticism
Over the years, a number of climbers have openly criticized and even rejected awards/or asked not to be considered:

 In 2005, British climber Ian Parnell, who was nominated on several previous occasions, asked for his nomination to be withdrawn to allow what he considered to be superior American ascents to be shortlisted; in 2006, Parnell wrote a lengthy critique of the awards in Alpinist, and concluded "The Piolet d'Or is certainly here to stay; in fact, its recent controversy has elevated its profile ..".
 In 2006, Italian climbers Alessandro Beltrami, Rolando Garibotti, and Ermanno Salvaterra asked that their ascent of the north face of Cerro Torre not be considered, saying: "It was the essence of the experience that interested us most. An award such as the Piolet d'Or tries to quantify this essence and attempts to judge the quality of the experience.... How could there be any real value to such a subjective judgment? How to judge elusive concepts like elegance and imagination?". In 2008, Garibotti also asked the jury not to consider the Torre Traverse he completed with Colin Haley.
 In 2007, multiple award winner Marko Prezelj publically rejected the award on stage to express his opposition to competition in alpinism; Prezelj then wrote a brutal critique of the awards in Alpinist magazine, that finished with the line: "I apologize if I have offended anyone who is addicted to Miss Fame; she gets around so watch out for STDs". After the new Charter in 2009, Prezelj would later reconcile himself with the awards, and accepted his 3rd Piolet in 2015 in Chamonix, and his 4th Piolet d'Or in 2016 at the ceremony in La Grave.
 In 2010, Polish climber Wojciech Kurtyka declined the invitation to accept the newly created "Lifetime Achievement Award" by GHM President Christian Trommsdorff saying "I always had a sense of escaping to the mountains from everyday social bullshit, and now you propose to me to take part in it". Kurtyka was even more forceful in declining it in 2011 and 2012, saying: "Sorry. NO. NO! I will not be talking about Piolets d’Or anymore". However, in 2016, Kurtyka accepted the 8th "Lifetime Achievement Award" at the ceremony in La Grave.

2022 award (30th awards) 

The 2022 Piolet d'Or winners were announced in October 2022 by a 6-person technical jury consisting of Conrad Anker, Alex Bluemel, Genki Narumi, Paul Ramsden, Patrick Wagnon, and Mikel Zabalza:

  won the 14th Lifetime Achievement award.
 Northwest face of Saraghrar (7,340m, ED2 5.10 A3+ M5+, 8-days, alpine style) in Hindu Kush, Pakistan, by Georgians Archil Badriashvili, Baqar Gelashvili, and Giorgi Tepnadze.
 Moonwalk Traverse of the Cerro Chaltén Group (South-to-North, 5,000-metres, 10 summits, 5-days, rope solo) in Patagonia, by Sean Villanueva O'Driscoll.
 "Special Jury Award" for the Southeast Ridge (Patience) of Annapurna III (7,555m, 5.10a A3 M6, 16-days) in Nepal, by Ukrainians Mykyta Balabanov, Mykhailo Fomin, and Viacheslav Polezhaiko.

2021 award 

The 2021 Piolet d'Or winners were announced in October 2021 by a 6-person technical jury consisting of Ines Papert, Kelly Cordes, Victor Saunders, Valery Babanov, and Helias Millerioux:

  won the 13th Lifetime Achievement award.
 Emperor face (Running in the Shadows) of Mount Robson (2,500m, VI M6 AI5 A0, 2-days, alpine style) in the Canadian Rockies, by American Ethan Berman and Briton Uisdean Hawthorn.
 South face and southwest ridge (Revers Gagnant) of Sani Pakkush (2,600m, M4+ WI 4+, 2-days, alpine style) in the Tolltar Valley, Pakistan, by French climbers Pierrick Fine and Symon Welfringer.
 "Special Mention" for Catalan climber Silvia Vidal for her "cutting edge big wall solo ascents around the world".

2020 award 

The 2020 Piolet d'Or winners were announced in August 2020 by an 8-person technical jury consisting of Kazuaki Amano, Nikita Balabanov, Aleš Česen, Gerlinde Kaltenbrunner, Helias Millerioux, Enrico Rosso, Victor Saunders and Raphael Slawinski.

 Catherine Destivelle won the 12th Lifetime Achievement award.
 Northwest face (the UFO Line) of Chamlang (2,500m, WI5 M6, 6-days, alpine style) in Nepal, by Czech climbers Marek Holeček (2nd Piolet) and Zdeněk Hák (2nd Piolet).
 West face (Release The Kraken) of Tengi Ragi Tau (1,600m, AI5 M5+, 4-days, alpine style) in Nepal, by American climbers Alan Rousseau and Tino Villanueva.
 South face and southeast ridge of Rakaposhi (4,000m, 6-days, alpine style) in Pakistan, by Japanese climbers Kazuya Hiraide and Kenro Nakajima (2nd Piolet).
 Southeast face of Link Sar (2,300m, AI4 M6+, 8-days) in Pakistan, by American climbers Mark Richey (2nd Piolet), Steve Swenson (2nd Piolet), Chris Wright, and Graham Zimmerman.

2019 award (deaths of Lama and Auer) 
The 2019 Piolet d'Or winners were announced in July 2019 by a 7-person technical jury consisting of Sandy Allan, Kazu Amano, Valeri Babanov, Jordi Corominas, Fred Degoulet, Ines Papert, Andrej Štremfelj; for a second time the awards were held at the Ladek Mountain Festival, but were overshadowed by the recent deaths of two of the winners, David Lama and Hansjörg Auer.

Krzysztof Wielicki won the 11th Lifetime Achievement Award.
West ridge and the first ascent of Lunag Ri (1,500m, 2-days, solo) on the border of Tibet and Nepal, by recently deceased Austrian climber David Lama; his award was accepted by his family.
West face and the first ascent of Lupghar Sar West (1,000m, M4, 1-day, solo) in the Hispar Muztagh, by recently deceased Austrian climber Hansjörg Auer; his award was accepted by his friends.
North ridge and South face of Latok I (2,500m, ED+, 8-days) in the Karakoram, by Slovanian climbers Aleš Česen (2nd Piolet) and Luka Stražar (2nd Piolet), and British climber Tom Livingston.

2018 award (leaves France) 
The 2018 Piolet d'Or winners were announced at the new later time of August 2018 by a 7-person technical jury consisting of Valeri Babanov, Kelly Cordes, Jordi Corominas, Mick Fowler, Yannick Graziani, Silvo Karo, and Raphael Slawinsky; it was also announced that the ceremony would be held at the Ladek Film Festival in Poland, the first time there was no French ceremony.

Andrej Štremfelj won the 10th Lifetime Achievement award.
Southwest face (Satisfaction!) of Gasherbrum I (2,600m, ED+ WI5+ M7, 8-days) in Pakistan, by Czech climbers Marek Holeček and Zdeněk Hák.
Northeast face and traverse of Shispare (2,700m, WI5 M6, 7-days, alpine style) in Pakistan, by Japanese climbers Kazuya Hiraide and Kenro Nakajima.
"Special mention" for the southwest face of Nilkantha (1,400m, WI5 M6 A0, 5-days) in India, by American climbers Chantel Astorga, Anne Gilbert Chase, and Jason Thompson.
"Special mention" to Alex Honnold for outstanding contribution to climbing throughout the 2017 year.

2017 award 
The 2017 Piolet d'Or winners were announced in April 2017 by an 8-person technical jury consisting of Kazu Amano, Valery Babanov, Hervé Barmasse, Kelly Cordes, Andy Houseman, Thomas Huber, Sebastien Ratel, and Raphael Slawinski.
 Jeff Lowe won the 9th Lifetime Achievement award.
 North buttress and the first ascent of Nyainqentangla South East (1,600m, ED+) in Tibet, by British climbers Paul Ramsden (4th Piolet), and Nick Bullock.
 North buttress of Thalay Sagar (1,400m, ED2, M7 WI5 5.10a A3, 8-days) in Gangotri, India, by Russian climbers Dmitry Golovchenko (2nd Piolet), Dmitry Grigoriev, and Sergey Nilov (2nd Piolet).
"Special mention" for the south face of Gangapurna (1,500m, ED+) in Nepal, by Korean climbers Cho Seok-mun, Kim Chang-ho, and Park Joung-yong.
"Special mention" for the  Travesia del Torre Cerro Torre Group (1,600m, 5.10c, C1, 1-day) in Patagonia, by American climbers Colin Haley and Alex Honnold.

2016 award 
The 2016 Piolet d'Or winners were announced in April 2016 by a 9-person technical jury consisting of Valeri Babanov, Hervé Barmasse, Seb Bohin, Simon Elias, Yasuhiro Hanatani, Silvo Karo, Michael Kennedy, Victor Saunders, and Raphael Slawinski.  After several years of lobbying, Wojciech Kurtyka agreed to accept a "Lifetime Achievement Award".

 Wojciech Kurtyka won the 8th Lifetime Achievement award.
 North face and the first ascent of Gave Ding (1,600m, ED+, 5-days, alpine style) in Nepal, by British climbers Mick Fowler and Paul Ramsden (3rd Piolet for each).
 Northwest pillar (Hasta las Webas) of Cerro Riso Paron (1,000m, ED-, AI5+ M5, 3-days) in Patagonia, by French Jerome Sullivan, and Antoine Moineville, and Argentine Diego Simari.

2015 award (pre-announced) 
The 2015 Piolet d'Or winners were announced in March 2015 by a 9-person technical jury consisting of Kazuki Amano, Valeri Babanov, Hervé Barmasse, Stephane Benoist, Andy Houseman, Michael Kennedy, Ines Papert, Raphael Slawinski, and Andrej Štremfelj; in a departure from previous years, the winners were announced before the ceremony so the event was "not a competition, but a celebration". National Geographic noted that Alex Honnold's Piolet was the first to a climber who had never previously led an ice climb.

Chris Bonington won the 7th Lifetime Achievement award.
 Southwest face (Shy Girl) of Thamserku (1,620m, M4/M5, A2, 8-days, alpine style) in Nepal, by Russian climbers Aleksander Gukov and Aleksey Lonchinskiy.
 Moonwalk Traverse of the Cerro Chaltén Group (North-to-South, 5km, 8-peaks, up to 5.11d C1, 4-days, alpine style) in Patagonia, by American climbers Tommy Caldwell and Alex Honnold.

2014 award 
The 2014 Piolet d'Or winners were announced in March 2014 by a 6-person technical jury consisting of George Lowe, Denis Urubko, Catherine Destivelle, Erri De Luca (the Italian writer), Karen Steinbach, and Lim Sung-muk; in a compromise, the jury decided to award two Piolet awards out of the six shortlisted ascents.

John Roskelley won the 6th Lifetime Achievement award.
 South face of Annapurna (2,700m, 28-hours, solo climb) in Nepal, by Swiss climber Ueli Steck (2nd Piolet); the provenance for this ascent was questioned, but upheld by witnesses. 
 Northwest face and west ridge of K6 (2,700m, 5-days, alpine style) in Pakistan, by Canadian climbers Ian Welsted and Raphael Slawinski.

2013 award (everybody wins) 

The 2013 Piolet d'Or winners were announced in April 2013 by a 4-person technical jury consisting of Stephen Venables, Silvo Karo, Katsutaka Yokoyama, and Gerlinde Kaltenbrunner; in an unprecedented move, the jury announced that the entire short-list of six nominated ascents would receive a Piolet d'Or.  Montagnes magazine issued a statement condemning the decision saying that it: "weakens the event and its status, blurs the image of mountaineering in the eyes of the public and does not reflect the true personality of mountaineers who make history".

 Kurt Diemberger won the 5th Lifetime Achievement award.  
 South pillar (Nima Line) of Kyashar (2,200m, 5.10a A0 M5, 7-days) in Nepal, by the Japanese climbers Tatsuya Aoki, Yasuhiro Hanatani, and Hiroyoshi Manome. 
 Northwest buttress (Prow of Shiva) of Shiva (6-days, ED+, alpine style) in Himachal Pradesh, India, by British climbers Mick Fowler and Paul Ramsden (2nd Piolet for each). 
 Northeast spur of Muztagh Tower (18-days, semi-Alpine style) in Pakistan, by Russian climbers Dmitry Golovchenko, Alexander Lange, and Sergey Nilov.
 South face (The Torch and The Brotherhood) of Ogre I (5.9X AI5 M6R) in Pakistan, by American climbers Hayden Kennedy and Kyle Dempster.
 Southwest face (Spicy Game) of Kamet (2,000m, ED-: 5.10-, alpine style), Uttarakhand, India, by French climbers Sébastien Bohin, Didier Jourdain, Sébastien Moatti, and Sébastien Ratel. 
 Mazeno Ridge of Nanga Parbat (13km traverse, 18-days) in Pakistan, by Scottish climbers Sandy Allan and Rick Allen.  
 "Special recognition" was made of Hayden Kennedy and Jason Kruk's fair-means ascent of Compressor Route on Cerro Torre, and David Lama and Peter Ortner's first free ascent of the line.

2012 award (20th awards) 
The 2012 Piolet d'Or winners were announced in March 2012 by a 6-person technical jury consisting of Michael Kennedy, Valeri Babanov, Alberto Iñurrategi, Ines Papert, Liu Yong, and Alessandro Filippini (Italian journalist). The event was held in France and Italy and two Piolets were awarded from the short-list of 6 ascents, as well as a "Special mention".  

  won the 4th Lifetime Achievement Award.
 Southwest face (The Old Breed) and the first ascent of Saser Kangri II East (1,700m, WI4 M3, 4-days) in Eastern Karakorum in India, by American climbers Mark Richey, Steve Swenson, and Freddie Wilkinson; at the time, it was the second highest unclimbed peak in the world (after Gangkhar Puensum, which is closed to climbing).
 Northwest face (Sanjači zlatih jam) of K7 West (1,600m, VI/5, M5, A2, 6-days) in the Karakorum, by Slovenian climbers Nejc Marcic and Luka Strazar.
 "Special mention" for the south face of Torre Egger (950m, 6b+ A1 AI6, 2-days) in Patagonia, by Norwegian climbers  and Ole Lied.

2011 award 
The 2011 Piolet d'Or winners were announced in April 2011 by a 6-person technical jury consisting of Greg Child (Jury President), Enrico Rosso, Yannick Graziani, Simon Anthamatten, Michael Pause (German journalist), and Hiroshi Hagiwara (Japanese journalist); underlying the "new post-2008 Charter" for assessing ascents, the winners were very diverse expeditions underlining the "spirit of Alpinism".

Doug Scott won the 3rd Lifetime Achievement Award.
Southwest face (I-TO) of Mount Logan (2,500m, ED+, WI5 M6, 5-days, ultra-lightweight alpine style) in Canada, by Japanese climbers Yasushi Okada and Katsutaka Yokoyama.

2010 award 
The winners of the 2010 Piolet d'Or were announced in Chamonix (France) and Courmayeur (Italy) from 8–10 April 2010 by a 6-person technical jury consisting of Andrej Štremfelj (Jury President), Jordi Corominas, Lindsay Griffin (British journalist), Anna Piunova (Russian journalist), Robert Schauer, and Kei Taniguchi. In a break with tradition, Christian Trommsdorff, chairman of Piolets d'Or organizer Groupe de Haute Montagne, said at the ceremony that the winners exemplified the new post-2008 Charter, while the other nominees did not make the cut.  Also at the ceremony, Reinhold Messner was supportive of the new Charter, saying: "Alpinism starts where tourism stops. Today's trade routes on the 8000-meter peaks—climbed by commercial expeditions using fixed ropes, camps and Sherpas—are pure tourism that has nothing to do with alpinism. The Piolet d'Or celebrates alpinism".

Reinhold Messner won the 2nd Lifetime Achievement Award.
Southeast face of Cho Oyu (2,600m, M6 6b A2/3) in Nepal, by Kazakh climbers Denis Urubko and Boris Dedeshko.
North face of Xuelian (2,650m, M6 WI5 5.7 R) in Chinese Tien Shan, by American climbers Jed Brown and Kyle Dempster, and Scottish climber Bruce Normand.

2009 award (new Charter)
The Piolet d'or 2009 took place in Chamonix-Mont-Blanc (France) and Courmayeur in the Aosta Valley (Italy) on the 24th and 25 April 2009 by a 6-person technical jury consisting of Doug Scott (Jury President), Dario Rodriguez, Dodo Kopold, Jim Donini, Peter Habeler, and Yong ImDuck. Jury President Doug Scott heralded the new post-2008 Charter, saying: "This edition signals the rebirth of the Piolets d'Or. For us there are no winners, no losers. The honored are the ambassadors of an art, a passion". Jury member Peter Habeler added: "It is not a question of reaching success at all costs, by using financial or technical means (such as oxygen, fixed ropes, Sherpas, doping products etc.…). What counts is the style. Today even if the summit hasn’t been reached, the expedition can be honoured if it is innovative". In a new departure, three winners were announced under the headings of "Spirit of Exploration", "Commitment", and "Technical Difficulty" (this explicit sub-categorization would not be repeated in the future), a new "Lifetime Achievement Award" was created with Bonatti as the first recipient, and the first female Piolet winner, Kei Taniguchi, was announced. 

 Walter Bonatti won the first Lifetime Achievement Award.
 Southwest face (Samurai Direct) of Kamet (1,800m, M5+, WI5+, 12-days) in India, by Japanese climbers Kazuya Hiraide and Kei Taniguchi (first female winner); the "Spirit of Exploration" award.
 North face of Kalanka (1,800m, M5) in India, by Japanese climbers Fumitaka Ichimura, Yusuke Sato, and Kazuki Amano; the "Commitment" award.

2008 award (cancelled)
After the controversy of the 2007 awards, Philippe Descamps, the editor of Montagnes, looked for a wider opinion on how to improve the awards. The three co-founders of the awards, the GHM, Montagnes and Guy Chaumereuil (the editor of Montagnes when the awards were founded), produced a new "Charter", and decided to hold the 2008 ceremony not exclusively in France, as in the past, but south of the border in the Val d'Aosta, in Italy.  Concern still lingered over the need for stronger independent jury panels in deciding a winner, and whether there should be just a single winner.  These issues could not be resolved easily, and in January 2018, it was announced that the 2018 Piolet d'Or would be canceled while these debates were still in process.

2007 award (controversy)
The 2007 Piolet d'Or was awarded on 26 January 2007 in Grenoble, France. The awards were marked by controversy from the outset, with accusations by GHM president Leslie Fuscko that the shortlist was imposed by Montagnes magazine, making it a "journalist award".  GHM and the President of the jury, Slovenian climber Andrej Štremfelj, resigned from the awards.  Further controversy occurred when Marko Prezelj, the co-winner of the 2007 Piolet d'Or, rejected his award and wrote a scathing article criticizing the whole premise of the awards, and whether it was possible, or ethical, to have a single winner, saying: "I don't believe in awards for alpinism, much less trophies or titles presented by the public or the media", and "At the ceremony, I could see and feel the competitive spirit created and fueled by the event's organizers. Most of the climbers readily accepted this mood without understanding that they had been pushed into an arena where spectators thrive on drama, where winner and loser are judged".

The winners were:
 Slovenian climbers Marko Prezelj (2nd Piolet) and Boris Lorencic, for the first ascent of Chomolhari's north-west pillar (2,000m, M6+, 6-days).

The other four shortlisted ascents were:
 Kazakhstan climber Denis Urubko and Sergey Samoilov, for a new route in alpine style on the northeast face of Manaslu; won the 2007 Asian Piolet d'Or.
 Slovenian climber Pavle Kozjek, for a new route, and in 1-day, on Cho Oyu, and for submitting images of the Nangpa La killings; won the 3rd "People's Choice Award".
 Ukrainian climbers Igor Chaplinsky, Andrey Rodiontsev, and Orest Verbitsky for a first ascent on the north ridge of Shingu Charpa (1,500m, elements of 5.11d).
 British climbers Ian Parnell and Tim Emmett for the southeast pillar of Kedarnath Dome (1,500m, elements of 5.11c).

Pre-2007 (only one winner)
The following is the list of annual winners from inception in 1992 to 2006 (there was only one winner in these years).
2006 Steve House and Vince Anderson for the rapid light ascent of the Rupal Face of Nanga Parbat; after the controversy of 2006, the jury, and the 2nd "People's Choice Award", were unanimous.  
2005 Russian team led by Alexander Odintsov for the first direct ascent of the north face of Jannu; a controversial decision given the "heavy-style" siege tactics employed by the Russians, and the initial absence of some major American ascents (Ian Parnell withdrew to enable one through); the audience booed the decision at the ceremony and gave Steve House's "ultra-light" solo of K7 40% of their vote, in the newly created "People's Choice Award" (they gave Russians 5%); later that year, House wrote a strongly critical piece in Vertical Magazine of the jury's decision.  
2004  (2nd Piolet) and Yuri Koshelenko for an ascent on the south face of Nuptse.
2003 Mick Fowler and Paul Ramsden for a new route on the north face of Siguniang (6250m) in China.
2002  for a solo first ascent of Meru Central (6310m).
2001 (10th awards) Thomas Huber and Iwan Wolf for the first ascent of the direct north pillar of Shivling (6543m).
2000 Lionel Daudet and Sébastien Foissac for the ascent of the south-east face of the Burkett Needle; the jury controversially passed over Tomaž Humar's attempt to solo the south face of Dhaulagiri, calling it "a step too far" in risk and "heavily slanted toward media coverage", ex-juror Jean-Claude Marmier called Daudet and Foissac's ascent as something seen "two or three times a year in The American Alpine Journal for the last fifty years". The jury defended their choice as "a kind of philosophy of mountaineering, where the [physical] performance is not the only criterion....". 
1999 Andrew Lindblade of Australia and Athol Whimp of New Zealand for the first direct ascent of the north face of Thalay Sagar
1998 Russian team from Ekaterinburg led by Sergey Efimov for the first ascent of the coveted west face of Makalu; GHM President Jean-Claude Marmier resigned from the jury calling the decision "a real disaster", as the Russians had used "heavy-style" siege-tactics (unlike other unsuccessful "light-style" teams, adhering to the Piolet's ethos), and two of the Russian team were killed. 
1996 , Heli Neswabba, and Arthur Wutsher Germany for numerous new routes in the Ruth Glacier area of the Alaska Range and especially a new route on the south face of Mount Bradley; this award drew some criticism as being akin to a "lifetime achievement award" for Orgler, and not for the specific climbs in 1995.
1995  of France and Andy Parkin of England for the new ice and rock route up the Esperance Col on Cerro Torre.
1994 The youth high altitude expedition of the French Alpine Club (median age 20 years) for ascents in the Pamir Mountains.
1993  and Vincent Sprungli for the ascent of the east face of Torre South del Paine in Patagonia (the name of the route is "Dans l'Oeil du Cyclone").

See also

 Boardman Tasker Prize for Mountain Literature
 Francis P. Farquhar Mountaineering Award
 Snow Leopard award

References

Further reading

External links
2007 Piolet d'Or winner question awards, Marko Prezelj, (February 2007, Alpinist)
Piolets d'Or: A Short History of the Golden Ice Axe, Bernadette McDonald (2017, Himalayan Journal)
Russian and Asian Piolet d'Or: The "other" Piolets d'Or, Lindsay Griffin (2013, British Mountaineering Council

Piolet d'Or winners
Awards established in 1992
Mountaineering awards
Mountaineering festivals
International awards
20th-century sports awards
21st-century sports awards